is a railway station on the Hokuriku Main Line in the city of Echizen, Fukui, Japan, operated by West Japan Railway Company (JR West).

Lines

Station layout
The station consists of one side platform and one island platform serving three tracks. The station building is located on the south side of the tracks. The station has a "Midori no Madoguchi" staffed ticket office.

Platforms

Adjacent stations

History
Takefu Station opened on 15 July 1896. With the privatization of Japanese National Railways (JNR) on 1 April 1987, the station came under the control of JR West.

Passenger statistics
In fiscal 2016, the station was used by an average of 2,344 passengers daily (boarding passengers only).

Surrounding area
 Fukui Prefectural Takefu High School
 Murasaki Shikibu park
 Echizen Tamagawa Onsen

See also
 List of railway stations in Japan

References

External links

 JR West station information 

Railway stations in Fukui Prefecture
Hokuriku Main Line
Stations of West Japan Railway Company
Railway stations in Japan opened in 1896
Echizen, Fukui